RKO Radio Pictures: A Titan Is Born is a 2012 non-fiction book about RKO Radio Pictures and written by Richard B Jewell.

References

2012 non-fiction books
American non-fiction books
Books about companies
Books about film
English-language books
University of California Press books